Doctor at Large is a 1955 comedy novel by the British writer Richard Gordon. It is the third entry in the Doctor series of novels.

Adaptation
In 1957 it was made into a British film of the same title directed by Ralph Thomas and starring Dirk Bogarde, Donald Sinden, Muriel Pavlow and James Robertson Justice.

References

Bibliography
 Goble, Alan. The Complete Index to Literary Sources in Film. Walter de Gruyter, 1999.
 Pringle, David. Imaginary People: A Who's who of Fictional Characters from the Eighteenth Century to the Present Day. Scolar Press, 1996.

1955 British novels
Novels by Richard Gordon
Comedy novels
British novels adapted into films
Medical novels
Michael Joseph books